Pyaar Kiya To Darna Kya is a Hindi-Urdu phrase meaning "I have loved, so what is there to fear?". It may refer to:
 Pyaar Kiya To Darna Kya (1963 film), directed by B. S. Ranga and starring Shammi Kapoor
 Pyaar Kiya To Darna Kya (1998 film), directed by Sohail Khan and starring Salman Khan, Kajol and Arbaaz Khan
 "Pyar Kiya To Darna Kya", a song from the film Mughal-e-Azam (1960)